Transport UK Group (TUK) is a British transport operator which operates services in England, which commenced operations in February 2023 when it purchased the British assets of Abellio via management buyout.

History
In August 2022, Abellio agreed terms to sell its United Kingdom subsidiaries in management buyout led by managing director Dominic Booth, subject to approval by the Office of Rail and Road and partner organisations Merseytravel and Transport for London. The deal was completed when final approvals were received in February 2023.

Subsidiaries
Transport UK Group operates the following subsidiaries:
Abellio London, operates bus services under contract to Transport for London 
East Midlands Railway, operates the East Midlands franchise under contract to the Department for Transport
Greater Anglia (60% shareholding), operates the East Anglia franchise under contract to the Department for Transport
Merseyrail (50% shareholding) operates the Merseyrail concession under contract to Merseytravel
West Midlands Trains, (70% shareholding), operates the West Midlands franchise under contract to the Department for Transport and Transport for West Midlands

References

Companies based in London
Companies formed by management buyout
Transport companies established in 2023
2023 establishments in England